Porfirio Armando Betancourt Carranza (10 October 1957 – 28 July 2021) was a Honduran professional footballer.

Youth
Born in Lima, Honduras, Betancourt grew up in a soccer family. His father, Porfirio Betancourt played for Club Deportivo Olimpia and his two uncles played for Club Deportivo Platense. As a youth player, he played for the Honduran Brewery club beginning in 1976. Betancourt graduated from Escuela Internacional Sampedrana. In 1979, he entered Indiana University, in the United States, where he would play men's college soccer for three seasons (see photo). He scored 20 goals and assisted on 12 more his first year, earning first team All American honours. That season, the Hoosiers went to the quarterfinals of the NCAA tournament.

Betancourt joined the Honduran Olympic team for the 1980 Summer Olympics qualification tournament. When Honduras joined the US-led boycott of the games, Betancourt returned to Indiana.

For the 1980 collegiate season, Betancourt saw a drop off in his scoring, bagging 17 goals and assisting on 16 others. However, this was good enough to earn him second team All American honours. While Betancourt saw a personal slump, his team made it to the NCAA championship game where it lost to the powerhouse University of San Francisco team. His third season with Indiana showed Betancourt at the top of his game. He scored 27 goals, assisted on 9 more. He was showered with accolades, earning first team All America, and winning the Hermann Trophy as the best collegiate player that year. While Betancourt left Indiana University after his junior year to play for Honduras in the 1982 FIFA World Cup, he is still considered one of the greatest collegiate players ever.

Soccer America Magazine named him the Player of the Decade (1980s) and placed him on its College Team of the Century. In 1992, Indiana University inducted Betancourt into its Hall of Fame.

Professional
On 27 October 1981, the St. Louis Steamers of Major Indoor Soccer League (MISL) selected Betancourt in the first round (12th overall) in the college draft. Betancourt declined to sign with the Steamers and instead returned to Honduras to make himself eligible for the Honduras national team, then beginning qualification for the 1982 FIFA World Cup. When he returned to Honduras, he joined Real CD España. While Betancourt failed to play any of the Honduran qualification games, national team manager José de la Paz Herrera called up Betancourt to replace the injured Jimmy James Bailey. Betancourt would go on to play every minute of Honduras’ three games (0–2–1 record) during the cup.

After the World Cup, Betancourt moved to France to pursue a professional career with Racing Club Strasbourg, which played in the French First Division at the time. He joined Strasbourg in June 1982 and remained with the team until June 1984. During his time with Strasbourg, he played 38 league games, scoring five goals. He played another seven cup games, but scored no goals in them.

Betancourt returned to the US and signed with the St. Louis Steamers of Major Indoor Soccer League (MISL) for the 1984–85 season. In 1985, he was on the roster of Spanish club CD Logroñés, then playing in the Spanish Primera División.

In 1985, Betancourt was called up to the Honduras national football team for its qualification campaign for the 1986 FIFA World Cup. While Betancourt scored three times, Honduras failed to make the cup finals. Betancourt returned to the US and played with the Kansas City Comets of MISL during the 1987–88 pre-season.

He then returned to Honduras where he played for Marathón in 1988. He then moved to Florida where he lived for several years before returning to Honduras to enter politics.

International career
Betancourt was called up by Honduras national team coach Rodolfo Godoy to play for Honduras U-20 team for the qualification tournament for the 1977 FIFA Youth Cup. Betancourt scored 11 goals while leading Honduras to an undefeated record and a berth in the Cup. Honduras went 2–1 in group play, but failed to qualify for the second round.

He made his debut for the Honduras seniors in an April 1982 friendly match against El Salvador and has earned a total of nine caps, scoring five goals. He has represented his country in four FIFA World Cup qualification matches and played all three matches at the 1982 FIFA World Cup.

His final international was a September 1985 World Cup qualification match against Canada.

Death
Betancourt died of COVID-19 on 28 July 2021, in San Pedro Sula, Honduras.

International goals
Scores and results list Honduras' goal tally first, score column indicates score after each Betancourt goal.

References

External links
 
 MISL stats

1957 births
2021 deaths
People from Cortés Department
Association football forwards
Honduran footballers
Honduras international footballers
1982 FIFA World Cup players
C.D. Marathón players
Indiana Hoosiers men's soccer players
Real C.D. España players
RC Strasbourg Alsace players
St. Louis Steamers (original MISL) players
CD Logroñés footballers
Kansas City Comets (original MISL) players
Liga Nacional de Fútbol Profesional de Honduras players
Ligue 1 players
Major Indoor Soccer League (1978–1992) players
Segunda División players
Honduran expatriate footballers
Expatriate footballers in France
Expatriate soccer players in the United States
Expatriate footballers in Spain
Honduran expatriate sportspeople in France
Honduran expatriate sportspeople in Spain
Honduran expatriate sportspeople in the United States
All-American men's college soccer players
Hermann Trophy men's winners
Deaths from the COVID-19 pandemic in Honduras